Shorea acuminata (called, along with some other species in the genus Shorea, dark red meranti, light red meranti, or sometimes red lauan) is a species of plant in the family Dipterocarpaceae. It grows naturally in Sumatra and Peninsular Malaysia.

See also
Shorea
Shorea teysmanniana, a closely related tree in the Philippines more properly known as the Red Lauan.
Parashorea macrophylla, the White Lauan.

References

acuminata
Trees of Sumatra
Trees of Peninsular Malaysia
Taxonomy articles created by Polbot